The dusky tapaculo (Scytalopus fuscus) is a species of bird in the family Rhinocryptidae. It is endemic to Chile.

Taxonomy and systematics

The dusky tapaculo was formerly considered a subspecies of Magellanic tapaculo (Scytalopus magellanicus). Following 1997 and 2003 publications, it was raised to species status because of vocal differences and because the two are sympatric over part of their ranges.

Description

It is essentially gray all over, darker above and lighter below. The lower back and rump have a brown wash and the flanks are sometimes pale tawny brown with black bars.

Distribution and habitat

The dusky tapaculo is found only in central Chile. It inhabits the bottoms of densely vegetated valleys.

Behavior

Feeding

No information has been published about the dusky tapaculo's diet or foraging behavior.

Breeding

Little has been published about the dusky tapaculo's breeding phenology. One nest has been described.

Vocalization

The dusky tapaculo's song is a repeated short rising trill .

Status

The IUCN has assessed the dusky tapaculo as being of Least Concern. It is locally fairly common and occurs in at least one protected area. However, its habitat "has been largely destroyed and remains strongly fragmented. This species should probably be monitored".

References

External links
Dusky tapaculo at Avesdechile.cl
Dusky tapaculo videos at IBC

Birds of Chile
Endemic birds of Chile
Scytalopus
Birds described in 1837
Taxonomy articles created by Polbot